Sami Frey (born Samuel Frei; 13 October 1937) is a French actor of Iranian Jewish descent. Among the films he starred in are En compagnie d'Antonin Artaud (1993), in which he portrays French poet and playwright Antonin Artaud, and Bande à part (1964) by Jean-Luc Godard.

Selected filmography

References

External links

 

1937 births
Living people
French male film actors
Jewish French male actors
French people of Polish-Jewish descent
French male television actors
French male stage actors
20th-century French male actors
21st-century French male actors
Male actors from Paris